Bahorwa or Banspar Bahorwa is a village situated in the Belthara Road tehsil of Uttar Pradesh, India. According to 2001 census, Bahorwa has a population of about 1204.The village is occupied by Ahir people of Eastern Uttar Pradesh.

Traffic
Bahorwa's nearest airport is Varanasi Airport which is 124 km from town. Bahorwa's nearest Railway station is Belthara Road which is about 1 km from the village. In Bahorwa there is a Belthara Road Bus stand.

Villages in Ballia district